Derived algebraic geometry is a branch of mathematics that generalizes algebraic geometry to a situation where commutative rings, which provide local charts, are replaced by either differential graded algebras (over ), simplicial commutative rings or -ring spectra from algebraic topology, whose higher homotopy groups account for the non-discreteness (e.g., Tor) of the structure sheaf. Grothendieck's scheme theory allows the structure sheaf to carry nilpotent elements. Derived algebraic geometry can be thought of as an extension of this idea, and provides natural settings for intersection theory (or motivic homotopy theory) of singular algebraic varieties and cotangent complexes in deformation theory (cf. J. Francis), among the other applications.

Introduction 
Basic objects of study in the field are derived schemes and derived stacks. The oft-cited motivation is Serre's intersection formula. In the usual formulation, the formula involves the Tor functor and thus, unless higher Tor vanish, the scheme-theoretic intersection (i.e., fiber product of immersions) does not yield the correct intersection number. In the derived context, one takes the derived tensor product , whose higher homotopy is higher Tor, whose Spec is not a scheme but a derived scheme. Hence, the "derived" fiber product yields the correct intersection number. (Currently this is hypothetical; the derived intersection theory has yet to be developed.)

The term "derived" is used in the same way as derived functor or derived category, in the sense that the category of commutative rings is being replaced with a ∞-category of "derived rings."  In classical algebraic geometry, the derived category of quasi-coherent sheaves is viewed as a triangulated category, but it has natural enhancement to a stable ∞-category, which can be thought of as the ∞-categorical analogue of an abelian category.

Definitions 
Derived algebraic geometry is fundamentally the study of geometric objects using homological algebra and homotopy. Since objects in this field should encode the homological and homotopy information, there are various notions of what derived spaces encapsulate. The basic objects of study in derived algebraic geometry are derived schemes, and more generally, derived stacks. Heuristically, derived schemes should be functors from some category of derived rings to the category of sets

which can be generalized further to have targets of higher groupoids (which are expected to be modelled by homotopy types). These derived stacks are suitable functors of the form

Many authors model such functors as functors with values in simplicial sets, since they model homotopy types and are well-studied. Differing definitions on these derived spaces depend on a choice of what the derived rings are, and what the homotopy types should look like. Some examples of derived rings include commutative differential graded algebras, simplicial rings, and -rings.

Derived geometry over characteristic 0 
Over characteristic 0 many of the derived geometries agree since the derived rings are the same.  algebras are just commutative differential graded algebras over characteristic zero. We can then define derived schemes similarly to schemes in algebraic geometry. Similar to algebraic geometry, we could also view these objects as a pair  which is a topological space  with a sheaf of commutative differential graded algebras.

Unfortunately, over characteristic p, differential graded algebras work poorly for homotopy theory, due to the fact . This can be overcome by using simplicial algebras.

Derived geometry over arbitrary characteristic 
Derived rings over arbitrary characteristic are taken as simplicial commutative rings because of the nice categorical properties these have. In particular, the category of simplicial rings is simplicially enriched, meaning the hom-sets are themselves simplicial sets. Also, there is a canonical model structure on simplicial commutative rings coming from simplicial sets. In fact, it is a theorem of Quillen's that the model structure on simplicial sets can be transferred over to simplicial commutative rings.

Higher stacks 
It is conjectured there is a final theory of higher stacks which model homotopy types. Grothendieck conjectured these would be modelled by globular groupoids, or  a weak form of their definition. Simpson gives a useful definition in the spirit of Grothendieck's ideas. Recall that an algebraic stack (here a 1-stack) is called representable if the fiber product of any two schemes is isomorphic to a scheme. If we take the ansatz that a 0-stack is just an algebraic space and a 1-stack is just a stack, we can recursively define an n-stack as an object such that the fiber product along any two schemes is an (n-1)-stack. If we go back to the definition of an algebraic stack, this new definition agrees.

Spectral schemes 
Another theory of derived algebraic geometry is encapsulated by the theory of spectral schemes. Their definition requires a fair amount of technology in order to precisely state. But, in short, spectral schemes  are given by a spectrally ringed -topos  together with a sheaf of -rings  on it subject to some locality conditions similar to the definition of affine schemes. In particular

 must be equivalent to the -topos of some topological space
 There must exist a cover  of  such that the induced topos  is equivalent to a spectrally ringed topos  for some -ring 

Examples 
Recall that the topos of a point  is equivalent to the category of sets. Then, in the -topos setting, we instead consider -sheaves of -groupoids (which are -categories with a single object), denoted , giving an analogue of the point topos in the -topos setting. Then, the structure of a spectrally ringed space can be given by attaching an -ring . Notice this implies spectrally ringed spaces generalize -rings since every -ring can be associated with a spectrally ringed site.

This spectrally ringed topos can be a spectral scheme if the spectrum of this ring gives an equivalent -topos, so its underlying space is a point. For example, this can be given by the ring spectrum , called the Eilenberg–Maclane spectrum, constructed from the Eilenberg–MacLane spaces .

Applications 

 The formulation of the Geometric Langlands conjecture by Arinkin and Gaitsgory uses derived algebraic geometry.

See also 
Derived scheme
Pursuing Stacks
Noncommutative algebraic geometry
Simplicial commutative ring
Derivator
Algebra over an operad
En-ring
Higher Topos Theory
∞-topos
étale spectrum

Notes

References

Simplicial DAG

Differential graded DAG

En and E∞ -rings 

 Spectral algebraic geometry - Rezk
Operads and Sheaf Cohomology - JP May - -rings over characteristic 0 and -structure for sheaf cohomology
 Tangent complex and Hochschild cohomology of En-rings https://arxiv.org/abs/1104.0181
 Francis, John; Derived Algebraic Geometry Over -Rings

Applications 

Lowrey, Parker; Schürg, Timo. (2018). Grothendieck-Riemann-Roch for Derived Schemes
Ciocan-Fontanine, I., Kapranov, M. (2007). Virtual fundamental classes via dg-manifolds
Mann, E., Robalo M. (2018). Gromov-Witten theory with derived algebraic geometry
Ben-Zvi, D., Francis, J., and D. Nadler. Integral Transforms and Drinfeld Centers in Derived Algebraic Geometry.

Quantum Field Theories 

 Notes on supersymmetric and holomorphic field theories in dimensions 2 and 4

External links 
Jacob Lurie's Home Page
Overview of Spectral Algebraic Geometry
DAG reading group (Fall 2011) at Harvard
http://ncatlab.org/nlab/show/derived+algebraic+geometry
Michigan Derived Algebraic Geometry RTG Learning Workshop, 2012
Derived algebraic geometry: how to reach research level math?
Derived Algebraic Geometry and Chow Rings/Chow Motives
Gabriele Vezzosi, An overview of derived algebraic geometry, October 2013

Algebraic geometry
Homotopical algebra
Algebraic topology
Ring theory
Scheme theory